Art destruction involves the damaging or destruction of works of art. This can happen through a natural process, an accident, or deliberate human involvement.

Natural destruction

All physical works of art are slowly affected and degraded by the natural elements. Some may survive long enough to allow the slow processes of erosion to act on them. Works of art may also be destroyed by natural disasters.

The Great Sphinx of Giza is slowly eroding. Most experts believe it is a natural process, but some believe acid rain is accelerating the process.
It is estimated that tens of thousands of works of Japanese art dating as far back as the 13th century were destroyed in the 1923 Great Kantō earthquake and the ensuing firestorm that destroyed much of central Tokyo.
1,400 artworks were damaged beyond repair in the November 4, 1966 floods that devastated Florence, Italy, including Cimabue's The Crucifixion.
Ribeira Palace destroyed during 1755 Lisbon earthquake. Inside, the 70,000-volume royal library as well as hundreds of works of art, including paintings by Titian, Rubens, and Correggio, were lost. The royal archives disappeared together with detailed historical records of explorations by Vasco da Gama and other early navigators.
Royal Alcazar of Madrid was destroyed by fire on the Christmas Eve of 1734 with its gallery (Velázquez, Titian, Rubens, Ribera, and others.)

Accidental destruction

Many works of art have been damaged or destroyed by accident.
 On September 2, 1998, Swissair Flight 111 crashed near Halifax, Nova Scotia, Canada, killing 229 people. Pablo Picasso's 1963 work Le Peintre (The Painter) had been loaded on the flight as cargo and was also destroyed.
 In May 2004 a fire destroyed the Momart warehouse in east London. More than 50 works by abstract painter Patrick Heron and works by other artists were lost.

Intentional destruction

Of artwork designed to be destroyed

Many works of visual art are intended by the artist to be temporary. They may be created in media which the artist knows to be temporary, such as sand, or they may be designed specifically to be destroyed. Often the destruction takes place during a ceremony or special event highlighting the destruction. Examples of this type of art include:
Street painting
Sand mandala
Ice sculpture
Sand castles
Food art or Edible art

Additionally, some artists destroy their own work out of lack of self confidence or to gain a fresh start.  Claude Monet destroyed many of his own paintings, including 30 paintings in the water lilies series. In 1970, John Baldessari and five other artists destroyed all the paintings Baldessari had created between 1953 and 1966 in a bonfire. An artist also may limit the number and quality variation of his work to make it more scarce.

Festivals where artwork is destroyed:
The week-long Burning Man festival in the desert of Nevada, which began in 1986 with tens of thousands of participants who must pay a fee to attend, an entire city of art and self-expression is created. The focal point of the festival is a temple designed and built by artists. On the last day of the festival there is a ceremony known as a Temple Burn where the temple goes up in flames.
The Semana Santa (Easter week) festival in Antigua, Guatemala, where designs made out of flowers and colored sawdust are created in the street prior to being trampled by a religious parade.
The burning of Zozobra during Fiestas de Santa Fe in Santa Fe, New Mexico, usually during the second week of September.
The burning of falles in Valencia, Spain.

Of artwork not designed to be destroyed
Other works of art may be destroyed without the consent of the original artist or of the local community. In other instances, works of art may destroyed by a local authority against the wishes of the outside community. Examples of this include the removal of Diego Rivera's 1934 Man at the Crossroads mural from the Rockefeller Center and the destruction of the Buddhas of Bamyan statues by the Taliban government.
More than 14 Gustav Klimt masterpieces burned in a fire set by retreating SS forces at Immendorf Castle in May 1945

Iconoclasm is the general destruction of a type of work of art for religious or ideological reasons. Most publicly visible classical art showing religious subjects was destroyed or disfigured by Christians,  mostly after theirs had become the state religion. The same process was inflicted on classical and pagan art after the Muslim conquests, a process which continued for centuries, especially in India. 
The Byzantine iconoclasm was an internal process within the Greek Orthodox Church, led by changes of Byzantine Emperor, which was reversed after nearly a century.
In the Protestant Reformation, a great deal of Medieval and Renaissance religious art was destroyed in Protestant areas, mostly in orderly official removals, but sometimes in riotous attacks, of which the most notable was the Beeldenstorm which swept the Low Countries in the summer of 1566 kicking off the Dutch Revolt.
The French Revolution ushered in a period of widespread art destruction, motivated by anti religious and anti royalist ideology, both in France itself and other countries conquered in the French Revolutionary Wars. Similar destruction occurred for similar ideological motives following other revolutions such as the Paris Commune, the Russian Revolution, the Chinese Cultural Revolution, and the wars that sometimes followed them. 
In the 1930s and 1940s, Nazi Germany destroyed works of art they labeled "degenerate art". These were often non-realistic forms of art such as cubism and surrealism. Art created by Jewish artists was also destroyed.
Tens of thousands of works of art were destroyed in military actions in World War II. One of the best-known examples in Europe is Courbet's The Stone Breakers, which was destroyed in Dresden in 1945 during the Allied bombings. The original of Emanuel Leutze's Washington Crossing the Delaware, a work with an iconic status in the US, was destroyed in a British bombing of Bremen. Other works of art were destroyed in the destruction of Warsaw, the Blitz, in the bombings of Hiroshima and Nagasaki, and throughout Southeast Asia.
 Most of the artwork of Abdul Ghafoor Breshna, one of Afghanistan's most talented artists, was lost or destroyed in the many years of war which ravaged Afghanistan during the decades after the artist's death in 1974. 
Artworks destroyed in the September 11 attacks in the United States included a painted wood relief by Louise Nevelson, a painting from Roy Lichtenstein's Entablature series and a Joan Miró tapestry. The total value of artwork lost in the September 11 attacks is said to have been in excess of $100 million
Corridart was a six-kilometer exhibit of artworks in Montreal, intended to be part of the arts and cultural component of the 1976 Summer Olympics. Mayor Jean Drapeau, who deemed the artworks ugly, had them torn down two days before the Olympic games began.
In 1956, a vandal threw a rock at the Louvre museum's Mona Lisa, damaging it.
In 1982, Who's afraid of Red, Yellow and Blue IV was attacked days before it would be presented to the public
In 1986, the painting Who's afraid of Red, Yellow and Blue III was attacked with a knife
In 2017, a terror suspect attacked guards of the Louvre with machetes and was found carrying "bombs of aerosol paint" intended to "disfigure the masterpieces of the [Louvre] museum."

See also
Art intervention
Art vandalism
Digital preservation
Iconoclasm
List of World Heritage in Danger
Lost artworks
List of destroyed heritage
Destruction of Art in Afghanistan
Hatra#Destruction by ISIL
Nimrud#Demolition by ISIL
Slighting
List of films featuring the destruction of art and cultural heritage

References

Bibliography
Gunnar Schmidt: Klavierzerstörungen in Kunst und Popkultur. Reimer Verlag, Berlin 2012. .
Anne-Marie O'Connor: The Lady in Gold, the Extraordinary Tale of Gustav Klimt's Masterpiece, Portrait of Adele Bloch-Bauer 

Art crime

Iconoclasm